Khushal Bopche (born 16 August 1951) is an Indian politician from the Bhartiya Janta Party.

Political Career

 1976-1981 He started his political career as vice Sarpanch at Gram panchayat Hirdamali.
 1980-1985 he was Member of Panchayat Simiti Goregaon .
 1981-1985 He was President of Bhartiya Janta Yuva morcha Bhandara District.
 1985-1989  He was  MLA from Goregaon  in Maharashtra Assembly.
 1985-1990 He was President of Bhartiya Janta Yuva morcha Maharashtra Pradesh .
 1989-1991  He was also Member of Parliament representing Bhandara (Lok Sabha constituency) in 9th Loksabha .
 1995-1999 He was Member of legislative Assembly from Goregaon.  
 1997-1998 he was chairman of Public accounts Committee .
 2003 he was chairman of water conservation advisory council .
 He was a member of the Maharashtra Legislative Assembly, representing, Tirora. He defeated     Rahangdale Sushilkumar Sukhadev of NCP  by 623 votes in the 2009 elections.

Personal life

He was born and stay at Hiradamali, Goregaon in Gondia district.
He is Homoeopathic medicine practitioner and agriculturist by profession. He is married to Mrs Sushila and has two sons and three daughters.

References

People from Gondia district
India MPs 1989–1991
Maharashtra MLAs 1985–1990
Maharashtra MLAs 2009–2014
Living people
Lok Sabha members from Maharashtra
Maharashtra politicians
Bharatiya Janata Party politicians from Maharashtra
People from Bhandara district
1951 births